SSSL can stand for:

 Finnish Social Democratic Journalists' Union, trade union in Finland
 Sinasina Sign Language, sign language used in part of Papua New Guinea
 Stop Snitchin, Stop Lyin, album by The Game
 Super SSL, Secure Socket Layer, affordable SSL protection for associated TLD's (e.g. SSSL.XYZ)